At least six steamships have been called Orizaba:
 SS Orizaba – a New York-built wooden side-wheeled steamer, launched on January 14, 1854 and broken up in 1887.
  – a  UK ocean liner launched in 1886 and wrecked in 1905
 SS Orizaba – a  New York and Cuba Mail Steamship Company (aka Ward Line) vessel launched in 1889 
  – a  UK trawler launched in 1908 and still in existence in the 1940s
  – a  turbo-electric German cargo ship launched in 1939 and wrecked in 1940
  – a  US ocean liner launched in 1917 and scrapped in 1963 that served as a troop ship

Ship names